Ban Muang is a district (amphoe) of Sakon Nakhon province, northeast Thailand.

Geography
Neighboring districts are (from the west clockwise) Ban Dung of Udon Thani province, Fao Rai of Nong Khai province, So Phisai and Phon Charoen of Bueng Kan province, Kham Ta Kla, Wanon Niwat and Charoen Sin of Sakon Nakhon Province.

The Songkhram River marks the boundary of the district to the west.

History
The minor district (king amphoe) was created on 20 March 1968, when the three tambons Mai, Muang, and Dong Mo Thong were split off from Wanon Niwat district. It was upgraded to a full district on 16 November 1971.

Administration
The district is divided into nine sub-districts (tambons), which are further subdivided into 92 villages (mubans). The sub-district municipality (thesaban tambon) Ban Muang covers parts of tambon Muang. There are a further nine tambon administrative organizations (TAO).

References

External links
amphoe.com

Ban Muang